The 1969 Campeonato Profesional was the 21st season of Colombia's top-flight football league. 14 teams competed against one another. Deportivo Cali won the Torneo Apertura, while Millonarios won the Torneo Clausura. Cali went on to win their third league title in the triangular final which was held in January 1970, while América de Cali earned the right to enter the 1970 Copa Libertadores instead of Millonarios. Hugo Horacio Lóndero, playing for América de Cali, was the topscorer with 24 goals.

Teams

Torneo Apertura

Torneo Finalización

 Note: Millonarios took all their five penalties first, and Cali given the chance to match them. However, Cali missed their first penalty and the game ended there, as Millonarios had scored all of theirs.

Triangular Final

Top goalscorers

Source: RSSSF.com Colombia 1969

References

External links 
Dimayor official website

1969 in Colombian football
Colombia
Categoría Primera A seasons